Athoor is a legislative assembly in Dindigul district, that includes the city, Athoor. Its State Assembly Constituency number is 129. It is one of the 234 State Legislative Assembly Constituencies in Tamil Nadu, in India. Athoor assembly constituency is a part of Dindigul Lok Sabha constituency.

Madras State

Tamil Nadu

Election Results

2021

2016

2011

2006

2001

1996

1991

1989

1984

1980

1977

1971

1967

1962

1957

1952

References 

 

Assembly constituencies of Tamil Nadu
Dindigul district